The Acanthopleuribacteraceae is a family of Acidobacteriota.

References

Bacteria classes
Acidobacteriota